The Fox and the Crow are a pair of anthropomorphic cartoon characters created by Frank Tashlin for the Screen Gems studio.

The characters, the refined but gullible Fauntleroy Fox and the streetwise Crawford Crow, appeared in a series of animated short subjects released by Screen Gems through its parent company, Columbia Pictures.

Columbia cartoons
Tashlin directed the first film in the series, the 1941 Color Rhapsody short The Fox and the Grapes, based on the Aesop fable of that name. Warner Bros. animation director Chuck Jones later acknowledged this short, which features a series of blackout gags as the Fox repeatedly tries and fails to obtain a bunch of grapes in the possession of the Crow, as one of the inspirations for his popular Road Runner cartoons.

Although Tashlin directed no more films in the series, Screen Gems continued producing Fox and the Crow shorts, many of them directed by Bob Wickersham, until the studio closed in 1946. Screen Gems had acquired enough of a backlog of completed films that the "Fox and Crow" series continued through 1949.

By this time, Columbia had signed a distribution deal with a new animation studio, United Productions of America (UPA), to produce three "Fox and the Crow" shorts, Robin Hoodlum (1948), The Magic Fluke (1949), and Punchy DeLeon (1950). All three UPA Fox and the Crow cartoons were directed by John Hubley. The first two each received an Academy Award nomination for Animated Short Subject.

An unrelated, six-minute, silent animated short titled The Fox and the Crow, produced by Fables Studio, was released in 1921.

List of shorts

Screen Gems

UPA

In other media

Comic books

The Fox and the Crow starred in several talking animal comic books published by DC Comics, from the 1940s well into the 1960s. They starred with other characters in DC's Columbia-licensed talking-animal anthology Real Screen Comics (first issue titled Real Screen Funnies) beginning in 1945, then did likewise when DC converted the superhero title Comic Cavalcade to a talking-animal series in 1948.

The duo received its own title, The Fox and the Crow, which ran 108 issues (Jan. 1952 - March 1968). Until the 1954 demise of Comic Cavalcade, Fox and Crow were cover-featured on three DC titles. They continued on the cover of Real Screen Comics through its title change to TV Screen Cartoons from #129-138 (Aug. 1959 - Feb. 1961), the final issue.

The Fox and the Crow itself was renamed Stanley and His Monster beginning with #109 (May 1968), after the back-up feature, begun in #95 (Jan. 1966), that had taken over in popularity. For the last ten years of its existence, The Fox and the Crow was written by Cecil Beard, assisted by his wife, Alpine Harper. The illustrator was Jim Davis (b. 1915), although it was generally unsigned.

Feature films
Fauntleroy Fox and Crawford Crow were going to have a cameo in Who Framed Roger Rabbit, but were later dropped for unknown reasons.

See also
Golden age of American animation

Footnotes

External links

 The Columbia Crow's Nest via The Wayback Machine
 The Fox and the Crow at Don Markstein's Toonopedia. Archived from the original on July 30, 2016.
 

1951 comics debuts
Fox and the Crow
DC Comics titles
Fox and the Crow
Fox and the Crow
Animated duos
Comics by Arnold Drake
Film characters introduced in 1941
Film series introduced in 1941
Male characters in animation
Animated films about foxes
Fictional anthropomorphic characters
Works based on fables
Short films directed by Frank Tashlin
Films directed by John Hubley
Screen Gems film series